The 1991 MTV Video Music Awards aired live on September 5, 1991, honoring the best music videos from June 2, 1990, to June 15, 1991. The show was hosted by Arsenio Hall at the Universal Amphitheatre in Los Angeles.

This year saw the introduction of a new category, Best Long Form Video; however, this category would not be handed out again until the 2016 ceremony where it was renamed Breakthrough Long Form Video.  Meanwhile, the award for Best Post-Modern Video was renamed Best Alternative Video, and The Video Vanguard Award was renamed the Michael Jackson Video Vanguard Award in honor of Michael Jackson′s contributions to the culture of music videos.

R.E.M. led the night both in awards and in nominations.  Their video for "Losing My Religion" not only won Video of the Year, but it also took home a total of six awards, making them the biggest winners of the night.  Furthermore, R.E.M.'s ten nominations also made them the most nominated artist that night and "Losing My Religion" the most nominated video of the night.

Background
MTV announced on July 8 that the 1991 Video Music Awards would be held on September 5 at the Universal Amphitheatre in Los Angeles, with Arsenio Hall returning as host. Nominations were announced at a press conference hosted by Arsenio Hall on July 17. The ceremony broadcast was preceded by the 1991 MTV Video Music Awards Opening Act. Hosted by Kurt Loder and Tabitha Soren, the broadcast featured red carpet interviews and marked the first use of the Opening Act branding for the pre-show, which would continue through 2003. Following its initial MTV airing, the ceremony was syndicated to broadcast television.

Performances

In addition, Was (Not Was) served as the house band.

Presenters
 Pee-wee Herman – opened the show and welcomed the audience
 Linda Hamilton and Steven Tyler – presented Best Group Video
 Downtown Julie Brown – appeared in pre-commercial vignettes about the Viewer's Choice award and telling viewers what was 'coming up' on the show
 Christian Slater – presented Best Video from a Film
 Lenny Kravitz – presented Breakthrough Video
 Kurt Loder – interviewed various celebrities backstage before commercial breaks
 DJ Jazzy Jeff & The Fresh Prince – presented Best Dance Video
 Martha Quinn – appeared in pre-commercial vignettes telling viewers what was 'coming up' on the show
 Dennis Hopper – presented Best Direction in a Video
 Fred Savage – appeared in a backstage vignette with Pauly Shore
 Pauly Shore and Cindy Crawford – presented Best Long Form Video
 Color Me Badd – presented Best Choreography in a Video
 John Norris – appeared in a pre-commercial vignette telling viewers what was 'coming up' on the show
 Billy Idol – presented Best Alternative Video
 N.W.A – presented Best Rap Video
 Mike Myers and Dana Carvey (as Wayne and Garth from Wayne's World) – introduced the winners of the professional categories
 Jason Priestley and Jennifer Connelly – presented Best New Artist in a Video
 Ed Lover and Doctor Dré – appeared in a pre-commercial vignette telling viewers what was 'coming up' on the show
 Arsenio Hall (host) – presented the Video Vanguard award
 C.C. DeVille – appeared with Downtown Julie Brown before a commercial break to tell viewers what was 'coming up' on the show
 Pip Dann – announced the winner of the International Viewer's Choice Award for MTV Europe and introduced the other winners of the International Viewer's Choice Awards
 VJs Nonie (Asia), Richard Wilkins (Australia), Thunderbird (Brasil), Daisy Fuentes (Internacional) and Dionne Mitsuoka (Japan) – announced their respective region's Viewer's Choice winner
 James Brown and MC Hammer – presented a special Moonman to host Arsenio Hall for his four-year hosting stint and then presented the Viewer's Choice award
 Spinal Tap – presented Best Metal/Hard Rock Video
 Cher – presented Best Male Video and Best Female Video
 George Michael and Cindy Crawford – presented Video of the Year

Winners and nominees
Nominations and winners, except for the Viewer's Choice awards, were selected by a panel of approximately 1,000 members of the music industry.

Winners are in bold text.

References

External links
1991 MTV Video Music Awards at MTV
 Official MTV site

1991
MTV Video Music Awards
MTV Video Music Awards
1991 in Los Angeles
Pee-wee Herman